Pontremoli Cathedral (also Santa Maria del Popolo) is a Roman Catholic cathedral in Pontremoli, region of Tuscany, Italy. From 1787 to 1988 it was the episcopal seat of the Diocese of Pontremoli; since 1988 it has been a co-cathedral in the Diocese of Massa Carrara-Pontremoli.

History
As an ex-voto of gratitude to the Virgin for the waning of the plague of 1622, the present church was erected between 1636 and 1687 using designs by the architect Alessandro Capra. The Neo-Renaissance style facade was erected in 1926 by the architect Vincenzo Micheli.

The interior was frescoed by Francesco Natali with later artists adding stucco decoration. The church has a 13th-century icon of the Madonna del Popolo.

Among the paintings in the church are the following:
Birth of the Virgin by Giandomenico Ferretti
Visitation by Vincenzo Meucci
Marriage of the Virgin by Giuseppe Peroni
Annunciation by Giuseppe Bottani

References

Churches in the province of Massa and Carrara
Roman Catholic cathedrals in Italy
Cathedrals in Tuscany
Baroque architecture in Italy
Roman Catholic churches completed in 1687
17th-century Roman Catholic church buildings in Italy
Roman Catholic churches completed in 1926
20th-century Roman Catholic church buildings in Italy
1687 establishments in Italy